Fontaines is a commune in the Saône-et-Loire department in the region of Bourgogne-Franche-Comté in eastern France.

History
Formerly Fontanœ then Fontes. The village owes its name to the numerous source which spring from his territory. We find tracks of Roman time there. The village belonged to the Lords of Fountains, who built a castle, then to the bishops of Chalon there, who freed the inhabitants in 1299. The castle was plundered and destroyed in 1569. There was one prioress Benedictine, a chapel (Saint Nicolas) and several washhouses.

 There is a very beautiful Romanesque church of the 13th and 15th century, surrounded with a strengthened surrounding wall.
 This village in the peculiarity to have five washhouses what makes its currency " stony and health resort ".
 There are ruins of the monastery.
 And was recently built there a gymnasium.

See also
Communes of the Saône-et-Loire department

References

Communes of Saône-et-Loire